Ablerus macrochaeta is a parasitoid wasp that attacks the silverleaf whitefly and Aleurocanthus inceratus. The latter is a serious pest of sweet potato in China.

References 

Aphelinidae
Biological pest control wasps
Insects used as insect pest control agents
Insects described in 1927